Sugul is a rural locality (a selo) in Paspaulskoye Rural Settlement of Choysky District, the Altai Republic, Russia. The population was 63 as of 2016. There are 3 streets.

Geography 
Sugul is located east from Gorno-Altaysk, in the valley of the Paspaul River, 25 km southwest of Choya (the district's administrative centre) by road. Paspaul is the nearest rural locality.

References 

Rural localities in Choysky District